Vydūnas alley is a street in Kaunas, Žaliakalnis neighbourhood, bordering Ąžuolynas park in the north.

It was built by a special plan as a residential area of Temporary capital of Lithuania.  The alley was built according to writings of Lithuanian philosopher Vydūnas and was intersected with two radial streets - Minties ratas (Ring of Thought) and Gėlių ratas (Ring of Flowers).      

Streets in Kaunas